Deley is a surname. Notable people with the surname include:

François Deley (born 1956), Belgian swimmer
Johnny Deley, Belgian former darts player who competed in the 1988 World Professional Darts Championship
Ortis Deley (born 1973), British TV and radio host
Padmeswar Deley, Indian politician elected to the Assam Legislative Assembly in 1985 and 1991
Pierre Deley (1893–1981), French pilot